Kaitlyn Marie Savage (born October 27, 1990) is an American professional soccer player who last played for Orlando Pride in the National Women's Soccer League.

Playing career
Savage joined Perth Glory in January 2013 following an injury to Carly Telford.

Savage represented Adelaide United in the 2015–16 W-League and won the Goalkeeper of the Year award.

In July 2016, Savage joined Orlando Pride to play in the National Women's Soccer League. She made her debut just three days after joining the team from Glenfield Rovers in New Zealand. Standing in for regular goalkeeper Ashlyn Harris, Savage played a full match in a 2–1 win over Boston Breakers.

Honours

Individual
 W-League Goalkeeper of the Year: 2015–16

See also
 List of foreign W-League (Australia) players

References

External links

1990 births
Living people
Perth Glory FC (A-League Women) players
Adelaide United FC (A-League Women) players
A-League Women players
Orlando Pride players
National Women's Soccer League players
Women's association football goalkeepers
American expatriate women's soccer players
Expatriate women's footballers in Iceland
Expatriate women's soccer players in Australia
Expatriate women's association footballers in New Zealand
American expatriate sportspeople in Iceland
American expatriate sportspeople in Australia
Florida International University alumni
American expatriate sportspeople in New Zealand
Soccer players from Washington (state)
FIU Panthers women's soccer players
People from Gig Harbor, Washington
American women's soccer players
People from Fox Island, Washington